Zero Zap is a video game produced by the Milton Bradley Company for the Texas Instruments TI-99/4 and TI-99/4A home computer systems and programmed by Herb Schmitz. This game was part of the Milton Bradley Gamevision series, which consisted of seven cartridges: Connect Four, Yahtzee, Hangman, Zero Zap, Card Sharp, Stratego, and the Gamevision Demonstration Cartridge. These seven cartridges were the launch titles for the TI-99/4 in 1979. This would mark the first third party to actually release games for the TI-99/4 system. Milton Bradley was only planning on producing these cartridges for a short time period (about one year) before passing production over to Texas Instruments.

Zero Zap was featured in the 1984 book, The Best Texas Instruments Software: "Zero Zap is colorful, fast-paced, and has excellent sound." In contrast, Issue 1 of Classic Gamer Magazine gave Zero Zap a considerably less favorable review: "Moving on, we came across another lame Video-Pinball game. Zero Zap was for the TI-99/4A home computer.... Real pinball games, even the video-pinballs of the world are games of skill. Zero Zap is pure luck and utter garbage."

References 

TI-99/4A games
Milton Bradley Company video games